Bhojpuri cuisine is a style of food preparation common among the Bhojpuri people of Bihar and eastern Uttar Pradesh, India. Bhojpuri foods are mostly mild and tend to be less hot in terms of spices used. The cuisine consists of both vegetable and meat dishes.

Breads
Various kinds of breads are consumed in Bhojpuri cuisine. Millet breads are also cooked occasionally, depending upon the season.

Paranthas (also called  in western districts of Bhojpur region) are prepared for breakfast. Sometimes, layered paranthas with spices like  are also prepared.

Occasionally, deep-fried breads like puri, luchi, and kachori are also prepared. Puas (sweet pancakes) are also commonly cooked in monsoon season or on religious occasions.

Special breads exclusive to the region include:

 – a hard, unleavened wheat bread which is eaten along with chokha. Comes in many different kinds.  is a kind of litti which is stuffed with sattu and spices.

 /  /  – dal-stuffed bread which is either steamed or fried. The dough can be made using wheat flour or rice flour or semolina.

 /  – a soft, thin and double-layered roti
 – a thin batter spread over a skillet or tava like a dosa or 
 – these are fermented sweet fritters, usually made in bulk to be given to married daughters. Flour is mixed with jaggery and water, then left to ferment. After fermentation, the batter is beaten and balls of it are fried in ghee.
 – -flavoured bread
Dhuska – made by frying a batter of rice and lentil flour and served with aloo ghugni / chhole and eaten for breakfast
 – considered a dessert or a biscuit-like snack, usually prepared during 
On special occasions, breads like , stuffed naan, and rumali roti are also prepared.

Rice dishes 
Rice is one of the staple foods of the Bhojpur region. Plain-boiled rice is eaten almost every day with lentil soups, bean gravies, and curries. Other common rice dishes include:

  – rice cooked with salt and spices. Vegetables (green peas, carrot, cauliflower, tubers), chhena, and dal badis (lentil balls) are also added. Served with raita.

  – rice cooked with jaggery or sugar, and dry fruit and saffron are added.

  – partially cooked rice is mixed with beaten curd or yoghurt. Spices are added to enhance the taste and flavour.

  – rice is cooked in milk with ghee, dry fruits, sugar, and spices like cardamom. This dish resembles kheer, with a thinner consistency.

  – often consumed as a convalescent food, but also prepared on Makar Sankranti and in Magh month.  is mostly consumed with pickle, papadam, and yoghurt.  is a variant of  flavoured with lemon juice.

Lentils and pulses 

 Dal – lentils are mostly cooked into soups and consumed with rice and rotis. However,  is most commonly cooked. It is often flavoured with dry mango, and jaggery.

  – prepared from fermented .  is soaked in water and left to ferment, after which it is husked and ground into a paste. Small dumplings are made out of the batter and dried in the sun before frying in hot oil.  are added in vegetable preparations or rice dishes.

 Phulvara (pholourie) – fritters made using  flour powder. Known as  locally.  batter is prepared with spices like black pepper and asafoetida. Small dumplings from batter are fried in hot oil. A hole is made in their centre using a wooden stick. It is served with chutney or dipped in yoghurt.

Peas and beans 

 Ghughni – a curry made of soaked and boiled peas or chickpeas. Variations of the dish use different types of peas or chickpeas, such as black gram, green peas, or white peas.

  – a spicy curry made by mincing peas or beans and sometimes even vegetables. Matar ka nimona is the most common variant. It is a popular winter dish.

Vegetable preparations

Preparation methods
  (stir-fried vegetables) – chopped vegetables stir-fried in vegetable oil with spices and condiments.

 Rasiya / rassewali bhaaji or jhol (vegetables with gravy or soup) – vegetables cooked with soup or gravy. Sometimes peas or  pieces are added to make aloo matar jhol or aloo chhena jhol.

 Bhariya / kalauji (stuffed vegetables) – vegetables like  (bitter gourd),  (aubergine),  (okra), or capsicum are stuffed with a special spice-mix and then cooked.

  (mashed vegetables) – vegetables like aubergines, tomatoes, and tubers are charred or barbecued and then mashed. They are then cooked with spices. Different variations of chokha include baingan chokha, aloo chokha and tamatar chokha. Aloo chokha is stuffed in flatbreads like paranthas to make aloo paranthas.

Common vegetable dishes

  – a local variety of pumpkin called  (from Sanskrit: Kushmanda) is cooked using aromatic spice blend called panch phodan. This dish is specially prepared for the festival Chhath Puja.

 Baigan adauri (baigan badi) – aubergines are cooked in mustard oil with onions, tomatoes, potatoes, peas, greens, spices, and Bhojpuri , a special kind of urad dal badis. It is served with rotis, makuni, or paranthas.

  – sponge gourd variety called  is cooked with chickpeas. This dish is a balanced meal and consumed as a light meal for lunch or dinner.

Leafy vegetable preparations 

  – refers to leafy green vegetable preparations. Leaves of various plants are used for preparing  include channa, bathua, methi, palak, sarson, matar, karemu, and noni. Channe ka saag is most commonly prepared. It is often prepared in marriages. Karemu ka saag is prepared on Rishi Panchmi festival.

Coated leaves are then folded and deep-fried in hot oil like fritters. They are commonly consumed in monsoon season in the months of Shraavan.

 Sakauda / saheena –  are spherical fritters prepared from leafy vegetables like spinach. These fritters can be eaten as it is or can be turned into chaat or curry.  is a popular street food of Prayagraj city in the Bhojpur region. In Bhojpuri households,  is commonly prepared.

Yoghurt-based dishes 

 Kadhi badi – a yoghurt-based curry cooked with gram flour. Fritters called  are added to it. It is eaten with rice.

  – yoghurt is mixed with flattened rice and eaten with jaggery or fruits. It is specially prepared for Makar Sankranti festival or as breakfast option.

 Dahi phulvari (dahi bada) – lentil flour fritters called  are prepared and soaked in flavoured yoghurt. It is specially cooked during marriages and Pitru Paksha.

 Dahi phulki (dahi puri) – miniature crisp puris / phulkis are soaked in flavoured yoghurt. The round and puffy puri shell is first broken on top and partially filled with the stuffing of mashed potatoes or chickpeas. A small amount of haldi powder or chilli powder, or both, may be added for taste, as well as a pinch of salt. Sweet tamarind chutney and spicy green chutney are then poured into the shell, on top of the stuffing. Finally, sweetened beaten yoghurt is generously poured over the shell, and the finished product is garnished with sprinklings of crushed sev, moong dal, pomegranate, and finely chopped coriander leaves.

 Raita – these are prepared using adding crushed or minced vegetable to flavoured yoghurt. Often boondis (raindrop-sized fried gram flour balls) are also added to make boondi raita. Sometimes sweet raita is also prepared using bananas.

Staple diet
Wheat (ganhum गँहूम्) and rice (chaaur चाउर) are the staple cereal. Maize (makai मकई), barley (jau जौ), and pearl millet (bajra बाजड़ा) are also often consumed in Bhojpuri cuisine.

Lentils (daal दाल), beans (lobiya लोबिया, rajma राजमा), green vegetables (tarkari तरकारी), leafy vegetables (saag साग), paneer (पनीर), fish (machhari मछरी), and meat (sikaar सिकार) are major constituents of the average diet. Mutton, lamb and chicken are eaten; beef and pork are avoided.

Breakfast
A heavy breakfast or a brunch is traditionally called  while a light breakfast is called . Breakfast in the region is bread-based and includes a variety made up of whole wheat or refined wheat flour such as roti, puri, parathas, especially sattu paranthas, chhena paranthas, and vegetable-stuffed parathas. These are served with saag-bhaaji, dahi (yoghurt), or raita. Breakfast is often accompanied with yoghurt-based drinks like mattha, chhachh, or banarasi lassi.

 (or ) – this is a sattu-stuffed wheat bread somewhat between kachori and litti. Typically eaten for brunch.

 – a fried bread made from fermented batter of rice and lentils.

 or  /  – another typical breakfast of Bhojpur region. There is also a Bhojpuri song that mentions this dish:

 with  – flattened rice is eaten with thick yoghurt. Some  (jaggery) is also topped in the dish. It is specifically prepared on Makar Sankranti.

On special occasions lapsi-puri, kheer/sevai-puri, pua-dahi, or chhola-puri are commonly served as breakfast. A more common breakfast served as street food includes puri bhaaji, chana, kachori, and jalebi.

Lunch
Lunch is rice-based and includes dal (split lentils cooked with water, turmeric powder, and salt), sabzi korma (vegetable or meat cooked in rich but mildly-spicy and balanced gravy), chokha (boiled, roasted, and mashed potatoes, eggplants, tomatoes mixed with several herbs and seasoning), chutney (dhaniya ka chutney or coriander chutney is the most traditional chutney of the region with rich flavours of coriander, green chilli, garlic, lemon, and mustard oil), bhujia (pan fried potatoes cut in finger shapes), pickles, and maybe roti instead of rice. On special occasions, several rice dishes like pulao or biryani are served.

Snacks
Generally served with tea in the evening. Most snacks are deep fried and salted. A common substitute is a handful and generous amount of dry fruits like kishmish (raisins), badam (almonds), khajur / chohara (dates), zameeni badam / chinia badam (peanuts), akharot (walnuts), chillgooza (pinenut), kaju (cashews), pista (pistachios), and anjeer (dried figs) soaked in milk.

Dinner
Dinner is also roti-based and is eaten with different vegetable preparations, such as:

  – stir fried vegetables sauteed with spices and tubers. These are generally dry vegetable preparations which are cooked without any gravy. Variations include parore aloo ki bhujia, bhindi aloo ki bhujiya, karele aloo ki bhujiya, kundru ki bhujiya, and chathail / kantola ki bhujiya.

 Rasili bhaaji – wet vegetable preparations which essentially include some gravy or soup. Examples include aloo gobhi ki rasili bhaaji, kathal ki rasili bhaaji, and aloo parwal ki rasili bhaaji.

Sometimes, roti is broken into a bowl of hot milk (can be sweetened) and then eaten; this is called doodh-roti. Sometimes, litti is grilled over charcoal or is baked in a clay oven and then eaten with chokha or murga (chicken korma). Dinner could change at special occasions and can be replaced by meat dishes like korma (meat with gravy), kebab, or kofta (meat balls with spicy gravy) and is served with tandoori roti (harder than the usual pan baked roti) or naan and salaad (salad).

Satvik khana
There is a tradition of eating satvik khana (sentient food) in the holy city of Banaras. It is a lacto-vegetarian diet and excludes the uses of garlic and onion.

Non-vegetarianism
Since ancient times, peoples of this region have consumed non-vegetarian dishes along with vegetarian diets. Non-vegetarian dishes are seen as delicacies and are eaten with great relish. It has always been a custom to serve guests a non-vegetarian dish at least once during their stay.

After the arrival of British, poultry became popular and now has become one of the largest contributor in meat-yielding animals. Still, mutton is regarded as the superior meat over poultry and fish.

Fish have also been popular since ancient times due to a large number of big and small rivers flowing through the region. Freshwater fish and small freshwater prawns also form a good proportion in total meat consumption.

Essentials

Spices and condiments

Spices are common but are used in moderation; sometimes dishes just contain two or three kinds of spices. This imparts a balanced aroma and taste without overloading the spices and making the dish very spicy and hot.

Panch phoran is a mix of five spices commonly used in Bhojpuri cuisine. This spice mix is the essence of the Bhojpuri dish panch phoran kohra, a sweet and spicy pumpkin-based curry flavoured using these five spices.

Other spices used in Bhojpuri cuisine include:

 Cumin seed (jeera)
 Caraway seed (shahi jeera)
 Cinnamon (darchini)
 Aniseed (saunf)
 Black pepper (kaali mirch)
 Asafoetida (heeng)
 Garam masala
 Red chili (lal or laal mirch)
 Green chili (hari mirch)
 Cardamom (elaichi)
 Black cardamom (badi elaichi)
 Nutmeg (jaifal)
 Mace (javitri)
 Saffron (kesat)
 Flax seed (tisi / alsi)
 Dried pomegranate (daadim)
 Carom seed (ajwain)
 Fenugreek seed (methi)
 Dried fenugreek leaves (kasuri methi)
 Onion seed (mangraila)
 Mango powder (amchoor)
 Dried mango (khatai)
 Coriander (dhania)
 Rose water (gulab jal)
 Turmeric (hardi)
 Salt (noon)
 Black salt (kala noon)
 Rock salt (sendha noon)
 Poppy seed (khas khas)
 Clove (lavang)
 Mustard (sarson)
 Bay leaf (tejpaat)
 Sesame seed (til)
 Olive (jaitun)
 Nigella seed (kalaunji)

Herbs, oils, and nuts

 Green coriander leaves (hara dhania patta)
 Mint leaves (pudina patta)
 Parsley (jafari)
 Holy basil (tulsi)
 Dill (sowa)
 Ginger (adarakh)
 Dried ginger (sonth)
 Garlic (lahsun)
 Onion (pyaz)
 Fenugreek leaves (methi ke patta)
 Tamarind (imli)
 Date (khajur)
 Lime (limu)
 Lemon (nimbu)
 Mustard oil (sarson ke tel)
 Olive oil (jaitun ke tel)
 Ghee
 Butter (maakhan)
 Hydrolysed vegetable oil (dalda)
 Almond (badam)
 Peanut (zameeni badam / chinia badam / moongphali)
 Walnut (akharot)
 Cashew (kaju)
 Dried fig (anjeer)
 Date (khajur)
 Dried apricot (zardalu)
 Dried plum (baiir)
 Pistachios (pista)
 Raisin (kishmis)
 Black raisin (sultana)

Tools and techniques
Handi (हांडी)
Kadahi (कराही)
Tava (तवा)
Tandoor (तंदूर)
Tasla / bhagona / patili (तसला)
Degchi (extra-large degchi is called deg or dig) (देगची)
Banarsi Dum technique (बनारसी दम तकनीक)

Common vegetables

Potato (aloo)
Cauliflower (phool gobhi)
Tomato (tamatar)
Brinjal (baingan)
Okra (bhindi)
Long beans (bodi / bora)
Calabash (lauka / kaddu)
Zucchini (tiroi)
Cabbage (bandh gobhi)
French bean (faras bean)
Pumpkin (kohda / kadoo)
Moringa (saijaan)

Festival delicacies
Regional festivals are celebrated by preparing several delicious dishes, which are shared with all communities irrespective of religion or caste.

Khichdi / Sekraat

Also called Makar Sankranti or Tilkut Sankranti, it is the first festival of the year. On this day, at morning, people eat til ke laddu, tilwa, tilkut, and laai. At lunch time, the combo of chura, dahi, and gud is eaten. And at evening, special khichdi is served along with melted ghee, pickles, papar, chokha, chutney, and dahi.

Vasant Panchmi
This festival celebrates the last day of the winter season and welcomes the spring season. On this day, lapsi is made of semolina and is eaten with puri.

Holi / Hori / Paguwa
Holi is one of the largest festivals of the Bhojpuri region. On this day, meat dishes and intoxicating drinks and sweets (thandai / bhang halwa) are the main attraction. In large families, a bakra / khasi (male goat / sheep) is bought a few days before the festival and is slaughtered on the day of festival. The backstrap and shoulder parts are cut into small pieces and marinated in garlic, onion, and few spices and then skewered over charcoal to make bihari seekh kebab. Liver (kaleji) is cut into small pieces and is pan fried with a little salt and pepper. This is a delicacy for children. The remainder of the meat is cooked as korma and eaten with pua (a batter of wheat flour and sugar with various dry fruits, deep fried in ghee). Meat dishes are eaten all day and shared with neighbours and relatives. In addition, a very sweet halwa made of dry fruits, condensed milk, and bhang is prepared.

In the evenings, people enjoy pakora, gulab jamun, chhole, dahi-baras, and kadhi-bari served with boiled rice.

Shivraatri
On this day, people who were fasting (especially women) eat phalahar (a fruit diet).

Ramnavami
Another major festival of the region. A night before this festival, women cook kheer, puri, dal-puri, and gulgula. After worshipping the next morning, these are eaten as offerings throughout the whole day.

Sattuani / Sattua Sankranti
This festival falls on Mesh Sankranti. A  is prepared on this day, which includes foods with cooling properties like sattu ka panna, aam ka tikora,  (cucumber) with roasted  powder and rock salt, and alsi ki chutney.

Janmashtami
This occasion is linked with special laapsi of singhara (chestnut) and khas-khas (poppy seeds).

Hartalika Teej
A day before the festival, women dedicate their whole day in preparing perukia. On the day of the festival, they offer this dessert and fruits to the god and after worshiping, it is eaten as an offering. It can be eaten for several days as it doesn't require preservation or refrigeration.

Navami / Navraatar and Dassahara
Satvik khana is eaten on all the nine days of Puja. On the tenth day (Dussehra), special dishes like puri, kachori, dum-aloo, chhole, jalebi pua, bari-kadhi, and dahi-bara are cooked. The evening after "Ravan-Dahan", there is a tradition of eating meat.

Diwali
Diwali is one of the largest festivals of the region and people enjoy eating numerous kinds of sweets and savouries, including gujia, anarsa, and ladoo. One sweet always associated with Diwali is cheeni ke khilone.

Chhath Puja
This is the largest festival of the region. It is celebrated for four consecutive days. On first day ("Nahay Khay"), after the holy bath in river, boiled small grain arwa chawal / sama ke chawal is eaten with lauki ki sabzi (bottle gourd sautéed in ghee) and chane ki dal. On second day ("Kharna"), people dip in holy Ganges and take the water home to cook rasiyaao and roti, which is eaten as Prasad at night. The next day ("Dala Chhath"), thekua, kasar, belgrami, and poori are prepared by the women who are fasting. After both the "Arghyas", on the fourth day, these sweets along with several fruits and dry fruits are served as Prasad and eaten for several days.

Dishes
Some dishes popular in Bhojpuri cuisine include:

Channa and chhole – chickpeas cooked in spicy gravy
Rajma – red kidney beans cooked in mildly spicy and creamy gravy
Lobiya – black eyed bean cooked in lightly spicy gravy
Dal makhani
Dal maharani
Dum aloo – potatoes cooked in spicy gravy with Benarasi Dum technique
Pitha
Urad ka daal
Chokha – roasted tomatoes, roasted aubergine, roasted potatoes, roasted brinjals mixed with garlic chilli and raw mustard oil
Raita – yoghurt dips
Kofta – meat, vegetable, or paneer balls cooked in spicy gravy
Maakuni – paratha stuffed with cooked potatoes or yellow/green peas or sattu
Aloo mutter
Kadhi-bari – fried chickpea flour dumplings cooked in spicy yoghurt
Mutton biryani – long grain basmati rice cooked with mutton or chicken
Bihari kebab – pieces of meat marinated in onion, garlic, and salt then skewered in seekh and then grilled over charcoal
Gulab jamun
Pua – sweetened wheat flour batter with nuts and raisins poured in a karahi of hot oil and fried
Petha – (locally called bhatuapag) a sweet white flavoured candy made up of ash gourd
Murabba – pickled fruits
Mardua and thekua – fried biscuits of wheat flour flavoured with aniseed
Anarsa
Dalpoori – poori stuffed with boiled and mashed dal
Litti chokha – bati stuffed with sattu
Nimona – made of green peas
Ghugni – pan fried and seasoned green peas or sprouted black gram
Dahi chooda – curd and chooda
Daal pithouri (dalpiththee) – wheat flour stiffly kneaded, rolled thick, and cut into different shapes, though a flower shape is common. It is then cooked with dal and seasoned with salt and pepper.
Gojha – stuffed with daal and cooked in steam
Gujhiya
Mal Pua
Padukiya
Laktho
Bharwa
Nimki
Kachauri
Sev
Dalmot
Chana ke saag
Sarson ke saag
Bathua ke saag
Palak saag
Khesari ke saag

Desserts
Khurma
Malaiyo
Anarsa
Balushahi
Thekua
Gaja
Rasmalai
Rabri
Doodh pitha
Falooda
Lawanglata
Chandrakala
Khaja
Khajhulee
Meethe samose
Batasha
Halwa – a confectionary made generally of soozi (semolina), gajar (carrot), besan (chickpea flour), atta (whole wheat flour), singhara (chestnut), doodhi (bottle gourd), badam (almond), khas khas (poppy seeds).
Sohan halwa
Laddoo – made up of besan, motichur, bundi, gond, mewe
Barfi
Gulab jamun
Murabba
Petha
Kheer
Sheer korma
Sevai
Kalakand
Pera
Sohan papdi
Methi ke laddoo – enjoyed especially during winters. It is prepared by mixing powdered fenugreek seeds and powdered flax seeds with ghee, jaggery, nuts, and raisins.
Tilwa – enjoyed especially during winters.
Til ki laai
Tilkut
Parwal ki mithai
Jalebi
Belgrami – a dry sweet made up of maida, sugar, and ghee.
Pedukia / murki – a dry sweet made up of maida and stuffed with mixture of khowa / fried soozi (semolina, sautéed in ghee) and sugar, and then fried.
Ghujhia – pedukia dipped in sugar syrup.
Laktho – a dry and hard sweet made of maida and jaggery and seasoned with aniseed.
Malai kofta
Pua
Malpua
Sev-bunia (bundia)
Kulfi

Drinks
Banarasi lassi – a Varanasi variation of lassi. The curd for banarasi lassi is made with reduced milk, which gives it a creamy and thick texture. It is then sweetened, churned, and served with rabdi in earthen pots called kulhads.

 – a mango-based drink prepared during summer. Raw mango is first charred or barbecued in embers, then peeled and pitted. The mango pulp is then flavoured using cumin powder, rock salt, mint, and jaggery, then mixed with chilled water to make a drink.

 – a sweet and cold milk-based drink prepared with a mixture of almonds, fennel seeds, watermelon kernels, rose petals, pepper, poppy seeds, cardamom, saffron, milk, and sugar. It can be prepared in many variations. It is usually prepared for Maha Shivaratri and Holi festivals.

Kachras / ookh ka ras – a sugarcane juice flavoured with ginger, mint, lemon. It is commonly drunk in bright afternoon period during winters. Sometimes it is mixed with citrus juice (orange) to reduce sweetness.

Sattu panna / sattu ghol – a drink prepared with sattu (roasted chickpea flour) and served chilled. Sattu products are specially linked with Bhojpuri culinary tradition.

Falooda – a drink prepared from vermicelli, rose syrup, and sweet basil seeds.

Maththa (chhachh) – a curd-based drink that can be served plain, seasoned with spices, or sweetened.

Khas paanak

 Other drinks like milk (both flavoured and unflavoured), chai (tea), coffee, nimbu paani (lemonade), and rose syrup are also common.

Snacks

 – a spicy and crispy fried fritter made using besan (gram flour), onions, green gram, and green peas. It is usually accompanied with tea or coffee.

Pakaudi – many varieties available

Pholourie
Baingani
Kachori
Saheena
Bara
Chaat
Aloo tikki
Phuchka (also called phulki or gupchup)
Singhada
Nimki
Ghugni
Bhoonja
Thekua
Tikri
Mathri

Dips 
Dips like raita and chutney are important part of Bhojpuri cuisine. Dips are served as a side dish to enhance the taste of a main dish.

Raita

Raitas are prepared by mixing thick dahi (yoghurt) with several vegetable, herbs, and seasonings.
Lauki raita – bottle gourd raita
Kheera-gajar raita – cucumber-carrot raita
Pudina raita – mint raita
Bundi raita – bundi are rain drop size fried balls of chickpea flour batter
Sarson raita – mustard raita
Zeera raita – roasted cumin raita

Chutney
Dhaniye ka chutney – corriander leaves along with green chillies, garlic, salt, and a little lemon juice are ground to a thick, liquid paste.
Tamatar ka chutney – this chutney is either sweet or salted. The salted one is prepared by mixing chopped tomatoes, chopped onion, garlic, green chilli, green coriander, and salt. The sweet chutney has same procedure as with khajur and imli chutney.
Pudina ka chutney – mint leaves along with raw mango, green chillies, sugar and salt are ground to same consistency like dhaniye ka chutney.
Khajur ka chutney – dates are boiled or soaked overnight and mashed, then mixed with jaggery and cooked and tempered with a few spices.
Imli ka chutney – tamarinds are boiled or soaked overnight and then skinned, deseeded, and mashed, then mixed with jaggery and cooked and tempered with a few spices.
Dry fruit chutney – a chutney made of raisins with the additions of other nuts and dry fruits.

See also
 North Indian cuisine
 Cuisine of Uttar Pradesh
 Bihari cuisine

References

Indian cuisine by region
North Indian cuisine
Uttar Pradeshi cuisine
Bihari cuisine